Thomas John Hamilton FitzMaurice, 5th Earl of Orkney (8 August 1803 – 16 May 1877) was the son of John FitzMaurice, Viscount Kirkwall and grandson of Mary FitzMaurice, 4th Countess of Orkney. British prime minister, 1st Marquess of Lansdowne, William Petty-FitzMaurice (died 1805) was his great uncle.  He is interred in Latteragh graveyard in County Tipperary, Ireland.

Thomas married the Hon. Charlotte Irby on 14 March 1826. The Earl and Countess of Orkney's eldest son George William Hamilton FitzMaurice became the 6th Earl of Orkney. Their fourth son, Alexander Temple FitzMaurice, became a Groom of the Bedchamber in 1867 and later served in the Yeomanry Cavalry. Their fifth son, James Terence FitzMaurice (1835–1917) served in the Royal Navy and was promoted to captain in 1867. Their daughter, Lady Maria Louisa FitzMaurice (1837–1917) was the grandmother of Sir Christopher Bullock who was Permanent Under-Secretary for the British Air Ministry.

References

Earls of Orkney
FitzMaurice, Thomas
1803 births
1877 deaths
Thomas